Phenylcarbylamine chloride is a chemical compound that was used as a chemical warfare agent. It's an oily liquid with an onion-like odor. Classified as an isocyanide dichloride, this compound is a lung irritant with lachrymatory effects.

Synthesis
Phenylcarbylamine chloride is produced by chlorination of phenyl isothiocyanate.

See also
Chloropicrin
Phosgene

References

Lachrymatory agents
Pulmonary agents
Phenyl compounds
Imines
Organochlorides